Naila Al Moosawi is an Emirati business executive who has been a pioneer woman in the Middle East.

In 1998 she became an air traffic controller at Dubai International Airport, making her the first woman air traffic controller in the Middle East. Resigning that job after having children, in 2001 she became the first female site manager at the Emirates National Oil Company.

Today she is a Director at LafargeHolcim.

References

Year of birth missing (living people)
Living people
Air traffic controllers
Emirati women in business
Emirati business executives
Human resource management people